This is an incomplete list of lakes of the Northwest Territories in Canada.

Larger lake statistics

"The total area of a lake includes the area of islands. Lakes lying across provincial boundaries are listed in the province with the greater lake area."

List of lakes

See also

List of lakes of Canada

References

 
Lakes